Russet may refer to:
Russet (cloth), a coarse woolen cloth of brown or grey colour
Russet (color), a dark reddish brown color
Russeting, reddish-brown and coarse anomaly of fruit skin
Russet apple
Russet potato
Russet, West Virginia, an unincorporated community